The eighth Minnesota Legislature first convened on January 2, 1866. The half of the 21 members of the Minnesota Senate who represented even-numbered districts were elected during the General Election of November 8, 1864, while the 42 members of the Minnesota House of Representatives and the other half of the members of the Minnesota Senate were elected during the General Election of November 7, 1865.

Sessions 
The legislature met in a regular session from January 2, 1866 to March 2, 1866. There were no special sessions of the 8th Minnesota Legislature.

Party summary

Senate

House of Representatives

Leadership

Senate 
Lieutenant Governor
Thomas Henry Armstrong (R-High Forest)

House of Representatives 
Speaker of the House
James Beach Wakefield (R-Blue Earth City)

Members

Senate

House of Representatives

References 

 Minnesota Legislators Past & Present - Session Search Results (Session 8, Senate)
 Minnesota Legislators Past & Present - Session Search Results (Session 8, House)
 Journal of the Senate of the Eighth Session of the Legislature of the State of Minnesota
 Journal of the House of Representatives of the Eighth Session of the Legislature of the State of Minnesota

08th
1860s in Minnesota